Myachkovo is the name of several rural localities in Russia.

Myachkovo, Kaluga Oblast, a village in Babyninsky District of Kaluga Oblast
Myachkovo, Moscow Oblast, a selo in Raduzhnoye Rural Settlement of Kolomensky District in Moscow Oblast
Myachkovo, Nizhny Novgorod Oblast, a selo in Ilyinsky Selsoviet of Volodarsky District in Nizhny Novgorod Oblast
Myachkovo, Novgorod Oblast, a village in Gorskoye Settlement of Soletsky District in Novgorod Oblast
Myachkovo, Pskov Oblast, a village in Dedovichsky District of Pskov Oblast
Myachkovo, Vladimir Oblast, a selo in Alexandrovsky District of Vladimir Oblast